Darbhanga Airport  is a domestic airport and an Indian Air Force Station, serving Darbhanga, Bihar, India. It is located just at the outskirts of the city near the NH-105 and NH-57 highways, which passes through Darbhanga. The airport is operated by the Airports Authority of India (AAI). The foundation stone for the airport was laid by the then Chief Minister of Bihar, Nitish Kumar, and the then Civil Aviation Minister, Suresh Prabhu, in the presence of the State Civil Aviation Minister, Jayant Sinha, on 24 December 2018. After efforts taken by the MP of Darbhanga, Gopal Jee Thakur, and the then Civil Aviation Minister, Hardeep Singh Puri. Commercial flights started on 8 November 2020.

History
This airport was built by Maharaja Kameshwar Singh Bahadur of Darbhanga when he started his own private airline. It was funded by a private aviation company Darbhanga Aviation after Second World War. He purchased three former military Douglas DC3 aircraft. 
Darbhanga Aviation was started in 1950 and became defunct in 1962. 
During the 1962 Indo-China War, the airport was acquired by the Indian Air Force.

Structure 
Airport Authority of India built an Interim Terminal Building, a taxi track, and the apron area. The runway was strengthened to handle the Airbus A320 and Boeing 737 and a pre-fabricated building was erected to serve as a temporary terminal building. The government of India had sanctioned approximately ₹100 crores for these projects. On 16 Feb 2021 one Apron of 167 mt X 62mt was made operational. This Apron can accommodate Two B737-800/A320 at a time making the landing of planes smoother. Earlier due to the lack of parking space, airplanes had to wait in the sky. The terminal has six check-in counters, and a capacity to handle 200 peak hour passengers. A car parking facility has a capacity of 30 cars.

UDAN Scheme
In January 2018, SpiceJet was selected to operate flights from Darbhanga to Delhi, Bengaluru and Mumbai, under the Government's Regional Connectivity Scheme called UDAN.

Airlines and destinations

Statistics

Future 
The expansion plan is to develop a new passenger terminal, a new Air Traffic Control (ATC) tower, cargo facilities among other facilities close to NH-27 is being considered by the Airports Authority of India. Darbhanga MP Gopal Jee Thakur met Jayant Sinha and later Prime Minister Narendra Modi, and demanded to name the airport as Mahakavi Kokil Vidyapati Airport. This was also suggested by Jayant Sinha at the foundation stone laying ceremony for the construction of the current passenger terminal, by naming the airport after famous Maithili poet, Vidyapati.
 
As of March 2023, the Government of Bihar has acquired 24 acres of land for the runway expansion and another 54 acres for the construction of a new permanent terminal, while the remaining 24 acres for installation of Instrument Landing System (ILS) to facilitate night landing has been acquired and is under-construction, which will be completed by mid-2023.

See also

 Jay Prakash Narayan Airport, Patna
 Gaya Airport
 Airport Authority of India
 Bihta Air Force Station
 Raxaul Airport
 Purnea Airport

References

External links

Airports in Bihar
Transport in Darbhanga
2020 establishments in Bihar
Airports established in 2020